The University of Trnava (in Trnava) is one of the oldest universities in Slovakia. It is based in Trnava, in the west of Slovakia.

Historical university
The original Jesuit university was founded in 1635 by the Archbishop of Esztergom, Péter Pázmány. It had a faculty of arts, faculty of theology, faculty of law (since 1667) and faculty of medicine (since 1769). The early student body consisted mainly of ethnic Slovaks, who were then stateless ethnicity within the Kingdom of Hungary. Within decades, the University contributed to a formation of early Slovak intelligentsia, which began to formulate early nationalistic and ethnic demands of emancipation of Slovak people within the Kingdom. It lasted 142 years in Trnava when it was moved to Buda in 1777 and finally to Pest in 1784. Its legal successor is the Eötvös Loránd University in Budapest, Hungary.

Present-day university
The present-day university was established in 1992 and although bears the same name, it isn't a legal successor. It currently has five faculties, 4 of them seated in Trnava:
Faculty of Philosophy and Arts
Faculty of Education
Faculty of Health and Social care
Faculty of Law
and 1 in Bratislava:
Faculty of Theology

Notable staff
Zuzana Števulová, award-winning lawyer.

See also 
 List of early modern universities in Europe
 List of Jesuit sites

References

External links
  

Trnava
Buildings and structures in Trnava